Ketengah Jaya is a townships in Dungun District, Terengganu, Malaysia. It is located in area Paka, Dungun. This area is a concern under FELDA. The villagers are not native people. The main activity used to for the villagers are through oil palm plantation.

There were partition divided in this area in order to arrange them into the village style. The partition including:
ö Felda Kerteh 1
ö Felda Kerteh 2
ö Felda Kerteh 3
ö Felda Kerteh 4
ö Felda Kerteh 5
ö Felda Kerteh 6

References

Dungun District
Populated places in Terengganu